Elizabeth Susan Gleeson (7 March 1943 – 16 December 1989) was an Australian politician.

She was born in Warrnambool, where she attended St Anne's College. She received a Bachelor of Arts from La Trobe University, after which she worked as a research assistant to federal MP Harry Jenkins. A Labor Party member, she was a delegate to the state conference and directed John Cain's campaign. In 1985 she was elected to the Victorian Legislative Assembly as the member for Thomastown, but she died in 1989 while still in office.

References

1943 births
1989 deaths
Australian Labor Party members of the Parliament of Victoria
Members of the Victorian Legislative Assembly
People from Warrnambool
20th-century Australian politicians
Women members of the Victorian Legislative Assembly
La Trobe University alumni
20th-century Australian women politicians